Martin Christensen Braithwaite (born 5 June 1991) is a Danish professional footballer who plays for La Liga club Espanyol and the Denmark national team. He plays mainly as a forward, but he can also play as a winger.

Having begun his career at Esbjerg fB, he went on to play for Toulouse and Bordeaux in Ligue 1, and Leganés and Barcelona of La Liga. He also spent two years in England with Middlesbrough.

Braithwaite made his senior international debut for Denmark in 2013 and has earned 60 caps. He was part of their squads at the 2018 FIFA World Cup, UEFA Euro 2020 and 2022 FIFA World Cup, reaching the semi-finals of the 2020 tournament.

Club career

Esbjerg fB
Braithwaite started out in the academy at Sædding-Guldager Idrætsforening (SGI), after which he joined the biggest club in his city, Esbjerg fB. He then spent a short time at FC Midtjylland's sports academy, before moving back to Esbjerg, signing a three-year youth contract in 2007. During his second stint at the Esbjerg academy, Braithwaite went on trials with both Reggina and Newcastle United. He eventually made his Esbjerg debut in 2009, making 63 Superliga appearances for the club and scoring 12 goals, including nine in the 2012–13 season during which he appeared in every league game for the club. He won the Danish Cup with the club in 2012–13, scoring two goals in the semi-final second leg win over Brøndby IF.

Following his impressive displays for Esbjerg in the 2013 Superliga spring season and the Danish Cup he was called up to the Danish national squad in the summer of 2013. At the same time he was being rumoured to be attracting the interest of a number of European clubs including Auxerre, Rennes, Celtic and Hull City.

Toulouse
On 14 August 2013, while away on national duty for a friendly international against Poland, Danish public broadcaster DR reported that Braithwaite had been sold to French club Toulouse for an estimated DKK 15 million (roughly €2 million).

Braithwaite scored a career-best 11 league goals in both 2015–16 and 2016–17. His tally for the latter campaign included two goals in a 4–1 home win over rivals Bordeaux in the Derby de la Garonne on 20 August 2016, and another two on 14 October in a 3–1 win over eventual champions Monaco, also at the Stadium de Toulouse.

Middlesbrough
On 13 July 2017, Braithwaite signed a four-year contract with EFL Championship club Middlesbrough for an undisclosed fee, reported to be around £9 million. Under the initial management of Garry Monk, he became the club's third signing of the season, after Jonny Howson and Cyrus Christie. Braithwaite made his league debut for the club on 5 August 2017 at the Molineux Stadium, where Middlesbrough were defeated 1–0 by Wolverhampton Wanderers. He scored his first goal for the club on 30 September 2017, in a 2–2 draw against Brentford at the Riverside Stadium.

Braithwaite was loaned out to his former club Toulouse's rivals Bordeaux on 31 January 2018 for the rest of the season. He scored four goals during his time there, including two in a 4–2 home derby win over his previous employer on 12 May. He returned to Middlesbrough for the 2018–19 season, but quickly expressed his desire to leave the club and go to Spain to play instead. This was much to the dismay of Boro manager, Tony Pulis. After his unsuccessful attempt to leave the club in the 2018 summer transfer window, Braithwaite played the first half of the season for Middlesbrough, scoring three goals in 18 appearances.

Leganés
Braithwaite joined La Liga side CD Leganés at the beginning of the 2019 January transfer window on a loan deal until the end of season. He made his league debut for the club on 12 January, in a 1–0 victory against SD Huesca, coming on as a substitute for Guido Carrillo for the last 26 minutes, and scored his first goal four days later in a 1–0 Copa del Rey home win against Real Madrid.

Braithwaite scored his first league goal in a 1–3 loss at FC Barcelona on 20 January 2019, and finished the campaign with four goals in 19 league appearances. On 24 July, he agreed to a permanent four-year deal with the Pepineros for a rumoured fee of €5 million, hence becoming the second most expensive player in the club's history.

Barcelona
On 20 February 2020, Barcelona triggered Braithwaite's release clause of €18 million and signed him on a four-and-a-half-year contract. His release clause was set to €300 million. Barcelona were granted an emergency exception to sign Braithwaite outside of a transfer window because of the long-term injury to Ousmane Dembélé. Two days after signing, Braithwaite made his debut in a home match against Eibar, coming on as a substitute in the 72nd minute. He assisted the fourth and fifth goals in the 5–0 win, both off deflections. On 13 June 2020, Braithwaite scored his first goal for Barcelona following an assist by Lionel Messi in a 4–0 victory against RCD Mallorca.

On 24 November 2020, Braithwaite scored his first two Champions League goals in a 4–0 away win over Dynamo Kyiv, a match in which he also had an assist, in the 2020–21 season. On 2 December, he scored his third goal in the competition in the first half of the match against Ferencváros. On 3 March 2021, he scored the winning goal in a 3–0 win over Sevilla after extra time to secure Barcelona's place in the 2021 Copa del Rey Final.

On 15 August 2021, Braithwaite scored a brace and assisted teammate Sergi Roberto's goal in Barcelona's opening-day match of the 2021–22 season; a 4–2 home win against Real Sociedad. The following month, he was ruled out for three to four months with a knee cartilage injury against Getafe CF; fellow attackers Dembélé, Ansu Fati and Sergio Agüero were already injured, while Messi had left and Antoine Griezmann was out on loan.

On 1 September 2022, Braithwaite terminated his contract with Barcelona effective immediately.

Espanyol 
On 1 September 2022, Braithwaite signed a three-year contract with Espanyol as a free agent. On 4 September, he scored a goal on his debut in a 1–0 away victory over Athletic Bilbao.

International career
Having already represented several Danish national youth teams, in the summer of 2012, Braithwaite was offered the chance to represent Guyana, being eligible through his Guyanese father. He declined the offer and went on to make his senior debut for the Danish national team in June 2013 in a friendly against Georgia, starting the game and playing the first half. He remained in the squad for the 2014 World Cup qualification match against Armenia. Braithwaite scored his first international goal in his second match in a friendly in August 2013 against Poland.

In May 2018, he was named in Denmark’s final 23-man squad for the 2018 FIFA World Cup in Russia. On 16 October that year, he scored in a 2–0 friendly win over Austria, ending a five-year goal drought.

Braithwaite was part of the Danish squad that reached the semi-finals of UEFA Euro 2020, held in 2021. He scored the last goal of their 4–0 last-16 win over Wales in Amsterdam.

Personal life
Braithwaite has a Guyanese father and his younger sister Mathilde (born 2002) plays football for KoldingQ and for Denmark's U-16 national women's football team. His father Keith's birth surname was Brathwaite, the more common spelling in the Caribbean, but it was changed by US authorities to Braithwaite when Keith arrived in the country.

When Braithwaite was 5 years old he was diagnosed with Legg-Calve-Perthes disease.

Braithwaite is the nephew and business partner of the Danish-born, American-based, real estate developer Gareth Roger James Smith. They co-own real estate in the New York Market and are building a high-rise in Jersey City, New Jersey.

Braithwaite is married to French entrepreneur, journalist and television personality Anne-Laure Louis Braithwaite. They have two sons together. He is also the stepfather of his wife's two children from a previous relationship.

Career statistics

Club

International

Denmark's score listed first, score column indicates score after each Braithwaite goal.

Honours
Esbjerg fB
Danish Cup: 2012–13
Danish 1st Division: 2011–12

Barcelona
Copa del Rey: 2020–21

References

External links

 Profile at the RCD Espanyol website
 
 Danish national team profile
 Danish Superliga statistics
 
 

1991 births
Living people
People from Esbjerg
Danish men's footballers
Association football wingers
Association football forwards
Esbjerg fB players
Toulouse FC players
Middlesbrough F.C. players
FC Girondins de Bordeaux players
CD Leganés players
FC Barcelona players
RCD Espanyol footballers
Danish Superliga players
Danish 1st Division players
Ligue 1 players
English Football League players
La Liga players
Denmark youth international footballers
Denmark under-21 international footballers
Denmark international footballers
2018 FIFA World Cup players
UEFA Euro 2020 players
2022 FIFA World Cup players
Danish expatriate men's footballers
Expatriate footballers in France
Expatriate footballers in England
Expatriate footballers in Spain
Danish expatriate sportspeople in France
Danish expatriate sportspeople in England
Danish expatriate sportspeople in Spain
Danish people of Guyanese descent
Sportspeople of Guyanese descent
Sportspeople from the Region of Southern Denmark